Hyderabad Nawabs 2: estraight Dil Se.. is a 2019 Indian Hyderabadi-language film directed by R.K. starring Aziz Naser, Ali Reza, and R.K. The film is a sequel to Hyderabad Nawabs (2006).

Cast 
Ali Reza as Munna. This role was played by Mast Ali in the first film.
Aziz Naser as Pappu
R.K. as Mama
Farah Khan as Reshma, Munna's girlfriend
Gullu Dada and Hussain Bakhali as the duo Sajid-Wajid
Raghu Karumanchi

Production
Dheer Charan Srivatsav and Mast Ali did not star in the film since they had parted ways.

Release 
Suhas Yellapantula of The Times of India gave the film a rating of three out of five stars and opined that "Hyderabad Nawabs 2 doesn't always live up to its billing as a laugh riot but does have moments that shine and make you laugh out loud whenever you think of them". The film received positive-word-of-mouth upon release despite facing stiff competition from other Telugu films such as iSmart Shankar.

References

External links

2010s Hindi-language films
2019 films
Films set in Hyderabad, India
Indian comedy films